The Café Tortoni is a coffeehouse located at 825 Avenida de Mayo in Buenos Aires, Argentina. Inaugurated in 1858 by a French immigrant whose surname was Touan, it was named Tortoni after the Parisian café of the same name located on Boulevard des Italiens (where the elite of the Parissiense culture gathered in the 19th century). The café itself was Inspired by Fin de siècle coffee houses. Café Tortoni was selected by UCityGuides as one of the ten most beautiful cafes in the world.

History

The area the café currently occupies was previously the location of the Templo Escocés ("Scottish Temple"), and the Tortoni was located on the corner of Rivadavia and Esmeralda. In 1880 it moved to its present location, but had its entrance on the other side of the block in Rivadavia Street. In 1898 the entrance on Avenida de Mayo was opened, and the facade was redesigned by architect Alejandro Christophersen. At the end of the 19th-century the café was bought by another Frenchman, Celestino Curutchet.

In the basement, La Peña (see peña) was inaugurated in 1926, which fomented the protection of the arts and literature until its disintegration in 1943. Among its visitors were Alfonsina Storni, Baldomero Fernández Moreno, Juana de Ibarbourou, Arthur Rubinstein, Ricardo Vines, Roberto Arlt, José Ortega y Gasset, Jorge Luis Borges, Molina Campos, and Benito Quinquela Martín.

Over the years the café has been visited by many renowned people including politicians Lisandro de la Torre and Marcelo Torcuato de Alvear, popular idols Carlos Gardel and Juan Manuel Fangio, international figures like Albert Einstein, Federico García Lorca, Hillary Clinton, Victor Agapov, Robert Duvall and Juan Carlos de Borbón.

Currently the basement works as stage for jazz and tango artists, and for the presentation of book and poetry contests.  The café has conserved the decoration of its early years, has a library and at the back facilities to play billiards, dominoes and dice.

Illustrious visitors

Gallery

References

External links

 
 

Buildings and structures in Buenos Aires
Tourist attractions in Buenos Aires
Coffeehouses and cafés in Argentina
1858 establishments in Argentina
National Historic Monuments of Argentina
Restaurants established in 1858